Homoranthus papillatus, commonly known as mouse bush, is a flowering plant in the family Myrtaceae and is endemic to a small area in southern Queensland. It is a compact shrub with curved, linear leaves and pale yellow flowers arranged in upper leaf axils.

Description
Flowering occurs from September to November and the dry fruit forms September to December.

Taxonomy and naming
Homoranthus papillatus was first formally described in 1981 by Norman Byrnes from a specimen collected in Girraween National Park in 1976 and the description was published in Austrobaileya. The specific epithet (papillatus) is a Latin word meaning "budlike". The common name "mouse bush" is due to the strong odour the plant emits, that of the smell of mice.

Distribution and habitat
Mouse bush is endemic to Mount Norman in Girraween National Park, Queensland where it grows in heath on skeletal sandy soils among crevices of granite outcrops.

Conservation status
This homoranthus is a rare species with a highly restricted distribution and low population numbers. It has been given ROTAP conservation code 2VC-t. IUCN (2010) considered "vulnerable".

References

External links
 The Australasian Virtual Herbarium – Occurrence data for Homoranthus papillatus

papillatus
Flora of Queensland
Plants described in 1981
Myrtales of Australia
Taxa named by Norman Brice Byrnes